Carla Estrada (born Carla Patricia Estrada Guitrón; March 11, 1956 in Mexico City, D.F., Mexico) is a Mexican television producer, one of the foremost telenovela producers of Latin America.

Biography
In 2005, the Mexican government decided to place a statue of the producer in one of Mexico City's most important parks and on January, 2007 she appeared on People En Español's list of The 100 Most Influential Hispanics in the world. When aired in the United States, Estrada's telenovela Amor Real shocked the world by having higher ratings than all of the other television shows in America; placing Univision on top of American networks such as NBC and ABC.

Estrada went to the UAM in Xochimilco to study psychology. She decided not to follow that career soon after, however, and she asked to have her major changed. Given a choice of new classes she could take, she chose communications, in part because her father was a journalist and her mother an actress.

Before graduating from the UAM in 1978, Estrada had already been hired by Televisa. She made history at Televisa by becoming the first woman producer in Mexican television history, but her beginnings were humble: at first, no celebrity wanted to work with her. Over the years this has changed, however, and she has produced some of Mexico's (and Latin America's) most famous soap operas, while working with such famous actors as Adamari López, Adela Noriega, Lucero, Fernando Colunga, Gabriela Roel and many more. Estrada was asked to produce soap operas for Televisa by Victor Hugo O'Farril. Her first soap opera was Pobre Juventud. Before that, she had been the producer of the teen-oriented show, Xe-Tu, where many superstars, such as Gloria Trevi, participated.

Estrada has spoken about the abuse she had to go through during the production of Pobre Juventud, both on the mental and physical aspect. According to her, she was subjected to mistreatings by her own employees, who went as far as hitting her on her legs with a cable once, because they were not used to having a woman boss.

She has often spoken about the importance of transmitting positive messages through her shows and her fascination towards love stories.

Carla Estrada is considered by many, including personal friend Cristina Saralegui, to be the greatest soap opera producer in Mexico, and her soap operas generally have wide international acceptance. One of her projects,  Amor Real, was once watched by 59 percent of the Mexican audience.

Filmography

Awards & nominations

Premios TVyNovelas

References

External links
 

1956 births
Living people
Mexican telenovela producers
Mexican television producers
Women television producers
National Autonomous University of Mexico alumni
People from Mexico City
Amor real